Ivan Paul McKee (born September 1963) is a Scottish politician who has served as Minister for Business, Trade, Tourism and Enterprise since 2021, having previously served as Minister for Trade, Innovation and Public Finance, 2020-21 and Minister for Trade, Investment and Innovation from 2018 to 2020. A member of the Scottish National Party (SNP), he has been the Member of the Scottish Parliament (MSP) for Glasgow Provan since 2016.

Early life and education 
Brought up in Glasgow, McKee obtained a BSc.BEng in Manufacturing Sciences and Engineering from the University of Strathclyde and an MBA from Newcastle University.

Industrial and business career 
In 1986 he began a two-year period of voluntary service in Bangladesh with VSO. Following this, McKee worked for a variety of manufacturing companies. In 2005 he set up his own international manufacturing consultancy business and from 2009 to 2015 invested in, and successfully turned around, a number of manufacturing businesses including the purchase of distressed assets from Dunfermline-based Simclar whilst in Administration.

McKee has significant international experience having managed businesses in Scotland, England, Poland, Finland, Croatia and Bosnia.

Political activity 
McKee joined the Labour Party in 1980, leaving in the late 1990s. He returned to political activism during the Scottish Independence Referendum as a Director of Business for Scotland, making the business and economic case for a Yes vote. After joining the SNP in November 2014, McKee was selected to contest the Glasgow Provan seat for the Party at the 2016 Scottish Parliament election. He was Parliamentary Liaison Officer to the Cabinet Secretary for Economy, Jobs and Fair Work 2016–18. He backed Kate Forbes in the SNP leadership race in February 2023.

Other 
McKee is a former Trustee of the charity CEI which supports educational and health projects in rural Bangladesh. He was formerly a member of the Board of Common Weal. In 1996 McKee took part in an aid convey to Bosnia with charity Edinburgh Direct Aid.

Personal life
McKee is married and lives in Glasgow with his wife Ewa, whom he met in Poland. He has four children, all from previous relationships.

He is an atheist.

References

External links 
 
 profile on SNP website
 personal website

1963 births
Living people
Alumni of the University of Strathclyde
Scottish businesspeople
Ministers of the Scottish Government
Members of the Scottish Parliament 2016–2021
Members of the Scottish Parliament 2021–2026
Scottish National Party MSPs
People from Helensburgh
Scottish atheists
Alumni of Newcastle University
Members of the Scottish Parliament for Glasgow constituencies